Sérgio André Oliveira da Silva (born 19 September 1980 in Matosinhos), known as Pedras, is a Portuguese former footballer who played as a striker.

References

External links

Official blog 

1980 births
Living people
Sportspeople from Matosinhos
Portuguese footballers
Association football forwards
Liga Portugal 2 players
Segunda Divisão players
Leixões S.C. players
FC Porto B players
C.D. Aves players
S.C. Dragões Sandinenses players
F.C. Marco players
SC Vianense players
F.C. Tirsense players
F.C. Maia players
Leça F.C. players
Cypriot Second Division players
Olympiakos Nicosia players
PAEEK players
Portugal youth international footballers
Portugal under-21 international footballers
Portuguese expatriate footballers
Expatriate footballers in Cyprus
Portuguese expatriate sportspeople in Cyprus